Home Outfitters (known as Déco Découverte in Quebec; originally called Bed, Bath & More) was a Canadian retail home decor chain, owned by Hudson's Bay Company, that sold bedding, towels, housewares, and other home accessories. All 37 remaining stores were phased out in July 2019.

History
Home Outfitters originally launched in 1998 as Bed, Bath & More, before being revamped and relaunched under the new name in 1999. The chain peaked at 69 locations in October 2014.

In July 2014, HBC announced that it would begin integrating Home Outfitters into its Hudson's Bay retail division (including increased availability of its product line through Hudson's Bay locations and its website), along with the closure of 2 stores. In 2016, HBC rebranded three Home Outfitters locations in Winnipeg under the banner Hudson's Bay Home as a pilot.

In February 2019, HBC announced all 37 locations of Home Outfitters would be phased out.

References

Home decor retailers
Hudson's Bay Company
Defunct retail companies of Canada
Companies based in Brampton
Retail companies established in 1999
Retail companies disestablished in 2019
1999 establishments in Canada
2019 disestablishments in Canada
1999 establishments in Ontario
2019 disestablishments in Ontario
Canadian companies established in 1999
Canadian companies disestablished in 2019